Merry Arizona 97: Desert Stars Shine at Christmas is the third Christmas album released by United Cerebral Palsy, a leading service provider and advocate for children and adults with disabilities, including cerebral palsy.

Track listing 

Additional notes
 "O Come All Ye Faithful" was previously released by Eddie M on MoJazz Records
 "The Little Drummer Boy" was previously released by The Phoenix Boys Choir on New Haven Records

Credits and personnel

 Otto D'Agnolo - producer, arranger, engineer
 Michael Broening - producer
 C.C. Jones - producer
 Bob Freedman - producer
 Eddie M - producer, performer
 RAZZ!! - producer
 Jeff Dayton - producer

 Chris Bailey - producer
 Ed Block - producer
 Persephone - producer, performer
 Marie Ravenscroft - executive producer
 Al Oritz - performer
 Khani Cole - performer
 Marion Meadows - performer	
 C.C. Jones Orchestra - performer
 Nils Lofgren - performer
 The Phabulous Phoenicians - performer

 CeCe Peniston - performer
 Ashley Lucas - performer
 The Herndon Brothers - performer
 Buck Owens - performer
 Glen Campbell - performer
 Molly Mollen - performer
 The Phoenix Boys Choir - performer
 Brian Page - performer
 J. David Sloan - performer
 The Red River Christmas Jubilee Show Cast - performer

The list of 'Merry Arizona' compilations

See also
List of artists who reached number one on the US Dance chart

References

External links 
United Cerebral Palsy Official site

1997 compilation albums
1997 Christmas albums
Christmas compilation albums